"React Quotes" is the fifth episode of the fifth season of the HBO original series The Wire. The episode was written by David Mills from a story by David Simon & David Mills and was directed by Agnieszka Holland. It first aired on February 3, 2008.

Plot

Marlo assumes Proposition Joe's position as The Greeks' narcotics distributor in Baltimore. Vondas gives him a phone and shows him how to communicate with the Greeks without speaking. Marlo continues to use Levy to launder money and gives Levy his new cell phone number; Herc copies the number after hours. Partlow tells his family he is going away and prepares to ambush Omar in Monk's apartment. Dukie gets beaten up by Spider when he stands up to bullying from Kenard. Michael takes Dukie to Cutty's gym to learn how to defend himself. Cutty tries to explain to Dukie that his intelligence gives him some prospects and that even if he learns how to fight, it won't necessarily stop him from being attacked. Michael also tries to teach Dukie how to shoot, but his ineptitude at target practice leads him to recommend that Dukie avoid using guns.

Bond holds a press conference to announce the corruption charges against Senator Davis. Campbell convinces Davis to take the weight of the charges himself, and Davis begins a publicity campaign claiming that the investigation against him is racially motivated. Bubbles is amazed when he is given a negative HIV test and Walon tells him to let go of his shame over Sherrod's death. Herc gives Marlo's cell phone number to Carver, who in turn gives it to Freamon. However, Freamon is unsuccessful in convincing Daniels to approach Mayor Carcetti about opening a new investigation into Marlo. McNulty invents more details about his fake serial killer and leaks the story to Alma at the Baltimore Sun. Templeton is assigned by Gus to canvass the homeless, but he has little success and invents a quote from the "father of a homeless family".

The resulting story draws attention to the case and Daniels appeals to Carcetti for resources. The mayor only allows Greggs to assist McNulty, who, under pressure from Bunk, tells her to keep working her own cases. Freamon and McNulty decide to stage a phone call from the killer to give them probable cause for a wiretap on Marlo's cell phone number. When Templeton fakes a call to himself from the serial killer, McNulty seizes the opportunity. The story takes the front page. Freamon sets up a disconnected wiretap in Homicide that the police believe is monitoring the fake killer's cell phone, while Freamon uses the court paperwork to set up his own wiretap on Marlo's phone. Elsewhere, Elena confronts McNulty about his failing relationship with Beadie, while Beadie seeks advice from Bunk.

Omar and Donnie break into Monk's apartment where they are ambushed by Partlow, Snoop, Michael and O-Dog. Donnie is killed and Omar jumps from the fourth-floor balcony and disappears.

Production

Guest stars

Paul Ben-Victor as Spiros "Vondas" Vondopoulos
Amy Ryan as Beatrice "Beadie" Russell
Callie Thorne as Elena McNulty
Chad L. Coleman as Dennis "Cutty" Wise
Glynn Turman as Clarence Royce
Steve Earle as Walon
Felicia Pearson as Felicia "Snoop" Pearson
Marlyne Afflack as Nerese Campbell
Dion Graham as Rupert Bond
Delaney Williams as Jay Landsman
David Costabile as Thomas Klebanow
Sam Freed as James Whiting
Robert Poletick as Steven Luxenberg
William F. Zorzi as Bill Zorzi
Larry Andrews as Donnie
Darrell Britt-Gibson as O-Dog
Norris Davis as Vinson
Kwame Patterson as Monk Metcalf
Thomas J. McCarthy as Tim Phelps
Scott Shane as Scott Shane
Brian Anthony Wilson as Vernon Holley
Brandon Young as Mike Fletcher
Denise Boyd as AIDS clinic nurse
Keenon Brice as Aaron "Bug" Manigault
Thuliso Dingwall as Kenard
Brendan Walsh as Brendan Walsh
Larry Young as Larry Young
Tony Cordova as Michael McNulty
Arthur Laupus as Appointment Homeless Guy
Eric Ryan as Sean McNulty
Ptolemy Slocum as Business Card Homeless Man
Tony Small as Singer
John E. Fairley as Unknown
Joe Hansard as Nathan Levi Boston
Theodore M. Snead as Sports Desk Editor
Tony Tsendeas as Homeless Man #2
Alexandra Tydings as Arts Desk Editor

Uncredited appearances

Edward Green as Spider

Trivia 
The number Marlo gives to his lawyer in this episode—(410) 915-0909—returns a pre-recorded quote from Marlo. First reported in August 2012, the number is still active as of February 2023. At the time of broadcast the number was not in service.

References

External links
 "React Quotes" at HBO.com
 

The Wire (season 5) episodes
2008 American television episodes